Citicoline (INN), also known as cytidine diphosphate-choline (CDP-Choline) or cytidine 5'-diphosphocholine is an intermediate in the generation of phosphatidylcholine from choline, a common biochemical process in cell membranes. Citicoline is naturally occurring in the cells of human and animal tissue, in particular the organs.

Use as a dietary supplement
Citicoline is available as a supplement in over 70 countries under a variety of brand names: Cebroton, Ceraxon, Cidilin, Citifar, Cognizin, Difosfocin, Hipercol, NeurAxon, Nicholin, Sinkron, Somazina, Synapsine, Startonyl, Trausan, Xerenoos, etc. When taken as a supplement, citicoline is hydrolyzed into choline and cytidine in the intestine. Once these cross the blood–brain barrier it is reformed into citicoline by the rate-limiting enzyme in phosphatidylcholine synthesis, CTP-phosphocholine cytidylyltransferase.

Research

Memory and cognition
Studies suggest, but have not confirmed, potential benefits of citicoline for cognitive impairment.

Ischemic stroke
Some preliminary research suggested that citicoline may reduce the rates of death and disability following an ischemic stroke.
However, the largest citicoline clinical trial to date (a randomised, placebo-controlled, sequential trial of 2298 patients with moderate-to-severe acute ischaemic stroke in Europe), found no benefit of administering citicoline on survival or recovery from stroke. A meta-analysis of seven trials reported no statistically significant benefit for long-term survival or recovery.

Vision 
The effect of citicoline on visual function has been studied in patients with glaucoma, with possible positive effect for protecting vision.

Mechanism of action

Neuroprotective effects 
Citicoline may have neuroprotective effects due to its preservation of cardiolipin and sphingomyelin, preservation of arachidonic acid content of phosphatidylcholine and phosphatidylethanolamine, partial restoration of phosphatidylcholine levels, and stimulation of glutathione synthesis and glutathione reductase activity. Citicoline's effects may also be explained by the reduction of phospholipase A2 activity. 
Citicoline increases phosphatidylcholine synthesis. The mechanism for this may be:
 By converting 1, 2-diacylglycerol into phosphatidylcholine
 Stimulating the synthesis of SAMe, which aids in membrane stabilization and reduces levels of arachidonic acid. This is especially important after an ischemia when arachidonic acid levels are elevated.

Neuronal membrane 
The brain preferentially uses  choline to synthesize acetylcholine. This limits the amount of choline available to synthesize phosphatidylcholine. When the availability of choline is low or the need for acetylcholine increases, phospholipids containing choline can be catabolized from neuronal membranes. These phospholipids include sphingomyelin and phosphatidylcholine. Supplementation with citicoline can increase the amount of choline available for acetylcholine synthesis and aid in rebuilding membrane phospholipid stores after depletion. 
Citicoline decreases phospholipase stimulation. This can lower levels of hydroxyl radicals produced after an ischemia and prevent cardiolipin from being catabolized by phospholipase A2. It can also work to restore cardiolipin levels in the inner mitochondrial membrane.

Cell signalling 
Citicoline may enhance cellular communication by increasing levels of neurotransmitters. The choline component of citicoline is used to create acetylcholine, which is a neurotransmitter in the human brain. Clinical trials have found that citicoline supplementation might improve focus and attention.

Glutamate transport 
Citicoline lowers increased glutamate concentrations and raises decreased ATP concentrations induced by ischemia. Citicoline also increases glutamate uptake by increasing expression of EAAT2, a glutamate transporter, in vitro in rat astrocytes. It is suggested that the neuroprotective effects of citicoline after a stroke are due in part to citicoline's ability to decrease levels of glutamate in the brain.

Pharmacokinetics 
Citicoline is water-soluble, with more than 90% oral bioavailability.

Side effects 
Citicoline has a very low toxicity profile in animals and humans. Clinically, doses of 2000 mg per day have been observed and approved. Minor transient adverse effects are rare and most commonly include stomach pain and diarrhea. There have been suggestions that chronic citicoline use may have adverse psychiatric effects. However, a meta-analysis of the relevant literature does not support this hypothesis. At most, citicoline may exacerbate psychotic episodes or interact with antipsychotic medication.

Synthesis

In vivo 
Phosphatidylcholine is a major phospholipid in eukaryotic cell membranes. Close regulation of its biosynthesis, degradation, and distribution is essential to proper cell function. Phosphatidylcholine is synthesized in vivo by two pathways
 The Kennedy pathway, which includes the transformation of choline to citicoline, by way of phosphorylcholine, produces phosphatidylcholine when condensed with diacylglycerol.
 Phosphatidylcholine can also be produced by the methylation pathway, where phosphatidylethanolamine is sequentially methylated.

See also 

 1-alkenyl-2-acylglycerol choline phosphotransferase
 Ceramide cholinephosphotransferase
 Choline-phosphate cytidylyltransferase
 Diacylglycerol cholinephosphotransferase
 Sphingosine cholinephosphotransferase

References 

Cholinergics
Nootropics
Nucleotides
Quaternary ammonium compounds
Choline esters